Gretchen Ortiz Pacheco (born June 3, 1986) is a Puerto Rican sailor.

She represented Puerto Rico at the 2020 Summer Olympics, ranking 17th in the mixed Nacra 17 event alongside Enrique Figueroa Suarez.

Notes

References

External links
 
 

1986 births
Living people
Puerto Rican female sailors (sport)
Olympic sailors of Puerto Rico
Sailors at the 2020 Summer Olympics – Nacra 17